The ABC Under-18 Championship for Women 2000 is the 15th edition of the ABC's junior championship for basketball. The games were held at New Delhi, India from 16–22 December 2000.

Draw

Preliminary round

Group A

Group B

Classification 5th–10th

9th place

7th place

5th place

Final round

Semifinals

3rd place

Final

Final standing

Awards

Most Valuable Player:  Chen Nan

External links
FIBA Archive

2002
2000 in women's basketball
2000–01 in Asian basketball
Bask
International women's basketball competitions hosted by India
2000 in youth sport